The Opéra-Théâtre de Metz Métropole, also known as the Metz Opera, is a 750-seat opera house and theatre located on the Petit-Saulcy island in Metz, capital of the Lorraine region, France. It is the oldest opera house working in France and one of the oldest in Europe. It is also one of the last possessing its own costume ateliers in France.

Construction and architecture

In 1732, Duke de Belle-Isle, governor of the Three Bishoprics and benefactor of Metz, decided the urban planning of the Petit-Saulcy island (then used to stock firewoods, and occasionally for horse-fairs), in order built in Metz a modern square in a context of the Enlightenment. The island was drained and the embankments and four bridges were built, connecting the medieval town to the island. The edification of the opera house was conducted by Messin architect Jacques Oger. Adjacent to the opera house, the urban planning included also the construction of the Royal Intendant palace by architect Barthélemy Bourdet.

The construction of the opera house extended from 1732 to 1752, the War of the Austrian Succession interrupting the works during 8 years. The Tuscany-influenced neo-Classical building is finally inaugurated with a public ball on February 3, 1752. The duke of Belle-Isle described it as "one of the most beautiful France's opera-theater" at his time, seating 1,382.

During the French Revolution, the guillotine for the executions was erected on the parvise of the opera house, the Comedy Square. In 1858, local sculptor Charles Pêtre, then member of the School of Metz artistic movement, adorned its facade with allegories of the Tragedy, the Inspiration, the Lyric Poetry, the Comedy, and the Music. The most recent restoration took place between 1981 and 1982 remodeling the interior of the opera house to improve comfort and sightlines. The performance hall had been reduced to 750 seats in 1963.

Performance and cultural policy
In the few years after its inauguration it staged several plays from the classic repertoire of the time, including those by Racine, Pierre Corneille, and Molière, whereas towards the end of the ancien regime more contemporary plays by Voltaire, Marivaux, Diderot, and Beaumarchais. As far as opera was concerned, opéra comiques by Grétry, and Montsigny were staged, as well as operas of Jean-Baptiste Lully.

Nineteenth century performances represented the work of both the major dramatists of the era (e.g., Hernani by Victor Hugo appearing just after its Paris premiere) and the major opera composers such as Weber, Vincenzo Bellini, and Donizetti, as well as the grand operas of Meyerbeer, Fromental Halévy, and Daniel Auber. During the season 1894–95, the theatre was presenting 187 events, of which 135 were in French and 52 in German.

The Metz Opera-Theater is fused in a unique Lorraine artistic pole with the National Opera of Lorraine. Today, the Opera-Theater features annually around sixty performances, including plays, choreographies, and lyric poetry.

See also
List of opera houses

External links

Official website of the Opéra-Théâtre de Metz Métropole
Official website of the agglomeration of Metz Métropole
 Official website of the municipality of Metz

Opera houses in France
Buildings and structures in Metz
Tourist attractions in Metz
Theatres completed in 1752
Music venues completed in 1752
18th-century architecture in France